The  Little League World Series took place between August 25 and August 29 in Williamsport, Pennsylvania. Mid-Island Little League of Staten Island, New York, defeated Obispado Little League of Monterrey, Nuevo León, Mexico, in the championship game of the 18th Little League World Series.

Teams

Championship bracket

Consolation bracket

External links
1964 Little League World Series
Line scores for the 1964 LLWS

Little League World Series
Little League World Series
Little League World Series
Little League World Series
Little League World Series